Azotey is a district in the department of Concepción, Paraguay.

References 

 
Populated places in Concepción Department, Paraguay